Sinar is a Swiss photographic equipment manufacturer. In the Malay or Indonesian languages it is a word meaning a ray of light, and appears in the name of a number of companies or publications. In the Bible, Shinar or Sinar is the place where the mankind was building the Tower of Babel.

Sinar may also refer to:

Newspapers
 Sinar Harapan, Jakarta, Indonesia
 Sinar Harian, Shah Alam, Selangor, Malaysia
 Sinar Hindia, Semarang, Dutch East Indies, 1900–1924
 Sinar Indonesia Baru, Medan, North Sumatra, Indonesia
 Sinar Sumatra, Padang, Dutch East Indies, 1905–1930s

Other uses
 Sinar (clothing), a Russian clothing manufacturer
 Sinar (radio station), a Malay-language station in Kuala Lumpur, Malaysia
 Sinar Mas Group, an Indonesian conglomerate
 Sinar College, a college in Malacca, Malaysia
 Rofin-Sinar, an American manufacturer of laser products
 Sinar (electric bike), an electric bike brand

See also 
 Sinnar, a city in Maharashtra, India
 Sinnar (Vidhan Sabha constituency), India
 Sinnar University, Sudan
 Sennar (disambiguation)
 Siner (disambiguation)
 Sinor (disambiguation)